Prince of Wales tea blend is a blend of Keemun black tea, Gunpowder green tea and a dash of currant juice or infused with dried currants. This produces a full-bodied cup with a bright liquor and strong aroma. It is named after Prince of Wales.

Typically served in the afternoon with scones in Britain, the blend was originally devised for Edward, Prince of Wales, later King Edward VIII and after his abdication the Duke of Windsor.

History
Prince Edward first granted Twinings permission to sell his personal blend using his royal title in 1921. Although Twinings of London has largely withdrawn its Prince of Wales tea from the United Kingdom market, it is still offered abroad according to Twinings's official regional websites. On its American packaging Twinings stated that
Prince of Wales is a pure China black tea sourced from regions including the Yunnan province and other southern regions of China. This blend is light in color and has a smooth and mild taste, with a well-rounded character. Great in the late morning or in the afternoon, it is perfect with or without milk and can be sweetened to taste.
As with many tea blends, such as Earl Grey and English breakfast, there is no set formula for what teas go into a Prince of Wales blend. Many are now produced. In Germany the Paul Schrader GmbH & Co. KG Bremen (founded in 1921) has offered a version since 1958 consisting of Chinese black teas and Darjeeling with a pinch of Lapsang souchong. However, this is a misapplication of the name "Prince of Wales" as applied to the tea blends, since the recipe is specific and quite well-known.

References

Further reading
 Campbell, Dawn (1995). The Tea Book

Blended tea
English drinks
Tea in the United Kingdom